A list of French ambassadors to the Kingdom of Great Britain:

Wars of Spanish Succession (1701–12)

 (1697)–1701 : Camille d'Hostun de La Baume, comte later duc de Tallard
 1701–15 : Jean-Baptiste Colbert, marquis de Croissy et de Torcy (Secretary of State for Foreign Affairs of France)
 1701–02 : Chevalier Jean-Baptiste de Poussin (Acting Attaché)
 1702–05 : Louis de Rouvroy, duc de Saint-Simon (Chargé d'affaires)
 1703–10 : Abbé François Gaultier (Acting Attaché)
 1705–07 : Nathaniel, Baron Hooke (Military Attaché: Brigadier-General, French Army)
 1708–10 : Charles-Auguste de Goÿon de Matignon, comte de Gacé (Chargé d'affaires)
 1710–10 : Count Luigi Ferdinando Marsigli (Franco-Italian Acting Attaché)
 1711–11 : Chevalier Nicolas Mesnager (Acting Attaché)
 1712–12 : Louis d'Aumont (Minister Plenipotentiary)
 1712–13 : Nicolas du Blé, marquis d'Huxelles (Minister Plenipotentiary)
 1713–13 : Nicolas Mesnager, later comte de Saint-Jean (Acting Attaché)
 1713–16 : Charles-François d'Iberville, marquis de La Bonde
 1716–18 : Abbé Guillaume Dubois (later Cardinal)
 1716–22 : Philippe Néricault Destouches, later comte de Langeron (Acting Attaché)
 1718–18 : Yves d'Alègre, marquis de Tourzel
 1718–20 : Henri, marquis de Saint-Nectaire 
 1722–24 : Théodore Chevignard de Chavigny, comte de Toulongeon
 1724–27 : François-Marie, comte later duc de Broglie
 1727–31 : Joachim Trotti, marquis de La Chétardie
 1731–31 : Théodore Chevignard de Chavigny, comte de Toulongeon
 1731–32 : Abbé Jacques Deschamps (alias Morel Deschamps, Acting Attaché)
 1733–35 : Philippe de Montboissier de Beaufort, marquis de Canillac
 1735–36 : Bishop Roger de Bussy-Rabutin (Minister Plenipotentiary)
 1737–39 : Gaston-Pierre-Charles de Lévis, vicomte de Lomagne later duc de Mirepoix 
 1740–41 : Chevalier Étienne de Silhouette (Acting Attaché)
 1741–42 : Gabriel-Jacques de Salignac, vicomte de Saint-Julien later marquis de Fénelon (Ambassador Extraordinary)

Wars of Austrian Succession (1741–48)
 1746–47 : Jerónimo, duc de Grimaldi 
 1747–47 : General Ricardo Wall y Devereux (Military Attaché (Borbón-Condé): later Prime Minister of Spain)
 1747–48 : Bishop Guy de Guérapin de Vauréal (Acting Attaché)
 1748–49 : Louis de Cardevac, marquis d'Havrincourt (Minister Plenipotentiary)
 1749–54 : Gaston-Pierre-Charles de Lévis, duc de Mirepoix (Ambassador Extraordinary)
 1751–52 : Antoine-François, marquis de Lambertye (Chargé d'affaires)
 1752–53 : Charles Gravier, comte de Vergennes (Minister Plenipotentiary)
 1754–54 : François Beauharnais de Beaumont, marquis de La Ferté (Military Attaché)
 1754–55 : Charles-François de Broglie, marquis de Ruffec (Ambassador Extraordinary)
 1756–57 : Chevalier Charles d'Éon (Acting Attaché)
 1758–61 : Chevalier Jacques-Abraham Durand d'Aubigny (Minister Plenipotentiary)

Seven Years' War (1756–62) 
 1762–63 : Louis-Jules Barbon Mancini-Mazzarini, duc de Nevers
 1763–67 : Claude-Louis-François Régnier, comte de Guerchy later marquis de Blosset
 1768–70 : Louis-Marie-Florent de Lomont d'Haraucourt, duc du Châtelet
 1770–76 : Jean-Étienne Say (Acting Attaché)
 1770–76 : Adrien-Louis de Bonnières, duc de Guînes
 1776–83 : Emmanuel-Marie-Louis, marquis de Noailles

American War of Independence (1778–82) 
 1783–84 : Chevalier Joseph-Mathias Gérard de Rayneval (Minister Plenipotentiary)
 1783–83 : Elénor-François-Elie, marquis de Moustier (Chargé d'affaires)
 1784–87 : Jean-Balthazar, comte d'Adhémar (Minister Plenipotentiary)
 1788–91 : Anne-César, chevalier later marquis de La Luzerne

French Revolutionary Wars (1792–1801) 
 1791–92 : Jean-Marie de Bancalis de Maurel, marquis d'Aragon 
 1792–93 : François-Bernard de Chauvelin, marquis de Grosbois
 1792–93 : Charles de Talleyrand-Périgord, Bishop emeritus later Prince de Talleyrand (Envoy Extraordinary)
 1793–93 : Citizen Hugues Maret later duc de Bassano (Envoy Extraordinary)
 1793–94 : Citizen François later marquis de Barthélemy (Envoy Extraordinary)
 1794–94 : Citizen Claude Monneron (Envoy Extraordinary)

 French Revolutionary Government Foreign Ministers

See also

List of ambassadors of France to England
List of ambassadors of France to the United Kingdom

References

Great Britain
 List
Ambassadors
fr:Liste des ambassadeurs de France au Royaume-Uni